Doom Asylum is a comedy slasher film written by Rick Marx and directed by Richard Friedman.

Plot
Attorney Mitch Hansen and his fiancée Judy LaRue get into a car wreck that results in Judy being killed. During an autopsy on the seemingly-dead Hansen (which disfigures his face), he wakes up and kills the medical examiners. Ten years later, a group of friends, including Judy's daughter Kiki, have a picnic near the asylum where Hansen was held. A punk band is using the asylum to practice some songs. However, Hansen still inhabits the asylum and plans to go after any perceived intruders.

Cast
Patty Mullen as Judy LaRue / Kiki LaRue
Ruth Collins as Tina
Kristin Davis as Jane
William Hay as Mike
Kenny L. Price as Dennis
Harrison White as Darnell
Dawn Alvan as Godiva
Farin as Rapunzel
Michael Rogen as Mitch Hansen
Harvey Keith as Medical Examiner
Steven G. Menkin as Assistant Medical Examiner (credited as Steve Menkin)
Paul Giorgi as Fake Shemp

Production
Principal photography was scheduled to begin on July 13th, 1987. The film was shot in 8 to 12 days.

Release
Doom Aslym had a theatrical screening in Milan Italy before it was officially released on home video in early 1988 through Academy Home Entertainment on VHS.

Reception
In his overview of 1980s horror films, Scott Aaron Stine declared it similar to other horror comedy films, finding it neither funny nor scary and he said that the film was "sophomoric drivel, the jokes are stale and the special effects are mostly awful."

References

Sources

External links
 

1988 horror films
1988 films
1980s slasher films
American slasher films
Slasher comedy films
Films shot in New Jersey
1980s comedy horror films
1980s English-language films
1980s American films